Wolff von Stutterheim (17 February 1893 – 3 December 1940) was a German Generalmajor.

Stutterheim was born in Königsberg, Germany. He came from an old military family which produced several generals and seven knights of the order Pour le Mérite. Eleven members of his family fell in action during World War I, including his father and two of his uncles. He was awarded the Pour le Mérite during World War I and the Knight's Cross of the Iron Cross during World War II.

Von Stutterheim was severely wounded in aerial combat over France while commanding Kampfgeschwader 77 on 15 June 1940. He died from his wounds in a Berlin hospital on 3 December 1940.

Awards

 Pour le Mérite (27 August 1918)
 Knight of the Royal House Order of Hohenzollern with Swords (31 October 1916)
 Iron Cross 2nd and 1st Class in February 1915
 Wound Badge in Gold
 Clasp to the Iron Cross 2nd and 1st Class
 Knight's Cross of the Iron Cross (4 July 1940)

References

 

1893 births
1940 deaths
Military personnel from Königsberg
Recipients of the Pour le Mérite (military class)
German Army personnel of World War I
German foresters
Luftwaffe World War II generals
Recipients of the Knight's Cross of the Iron Cross
Burials at the Invalids' Cemetery
Prussian Army personnel
German untitled nobility
Luftwaffe personnel killed in World War II
Recipients of the clasp to the Iron Cross, 1st class
Major generals of the Luftwaffe
20th-century Freikorps personnel